Ionel Sorin Trofin (born 31 January 1976) is a Romanian footballer who plays as a midfielder and also manages Liga IV club Moinești since 2009. In his career Trofin played in Liga I for: FCM Bacău, Farul Constanţa and Dacia Mioveni.

International career
Sorin Trofin played two games for Romania, both of them being friendlies against Algeria.

References

External links
 
 
 

1976 births
Living people
People from Bălan
Romanian footballers
Romania international footballers
Association football midfielders
Liga I players
Liga II players
FCM Bacău players
FCV Farul Constanța players
CS Mioveni players
Romanian football managers